Leonardo Tricarico (born 9 September 1942) is a former Italian Air Force general. He served as Chief of Staff of the Italian Air Force from 5 August 2004 to 19 September 2006. Vincenzo Camporini was appointed as his successor.

References 

|-

Living people
1942 births
Place of birth missing (living people)
Italian aviators
Italian Air Force generals